Epiphyas haematodes is a species of moth of the family Tortricidae. It is found in Australia, where it has been recorded from New South Wales.

The wingspan is 15–19 mm. The forewings are fuscous, sometimes dotted with dark fuscous and usually reticulated with bright ferruginous. The hindwings are pale grey.

References

Moths described in 1916
Epiphyas